Aslacton Parish Land is a  biological Site of Special Scientific Interest west of Long Stratton in Norfolk.

This site has wet and dry unimproved meadows with a rich flora. Uncommon species include marsh arrowgrass, yellow rattle, fragrant orchid, common butterwort and adder's tongue. Snipe often breed there.

The site is private land with no public access.

References

Sites of Special Scientific Interest in Norfolk